Luzhu Station or Lujhu is a railway station on the Taiwan Railways Administration West Coast line located in Lujhu District, Kaohsiung, Taiwan.

History
The station was opened on 15 December 1902.

Around the station
 Hsinta Power Plant
 Kao Yuan University

See also
 List of railway stations in Taiwan

References

1902 establishments in Taiwan
Railway stations in Kaohsiung
Railway stations opened in 1902
Railway stations served by Taiwan Railways Administration